Quantify may refer to:
 Quantification (science), the act or process of quantifying
 in computing: IBM Rational Quantify, a profiling software, part of IBM Rational Purify
Quantify may refer to the measurement of quantity.